Home Reserve, LLC, is a furniture manufacturing company headquartered in Fort Wayne, Indiana, US. The company manufactures ready-to-assemble furniture and operates an e-commerce site in which sales are made direct to its customer base.

History 
The company adapted an e-commerce model in 2000. Previously, the company founders had been designing seating products for public lobbies in the healthcare and educational markets. In 2004, The Cincinnati Post reported that “the company has constructed other furniture for four generation and some designs were used on the sets of TV shows “ER” and “Touched by an Angel”.

In 2000, new product lines were created that were capable of being shipped in flat-packed containers, small enough to be handled by particularized parcel package services such as UPS or Fed-Ex ground. Home Reserve was recognized by UPS for its efforts in this science in their April 2005 Preferred Report.

Furniture line 
This company sells sofas, sectionals, love seats, chairs and ottomans with built-in storage space and replacement fabrics.

Development of  furniture e-commerce models 
The furniture industry has produced several e-commerce models. Although rapid growth has often been a component of these attempts, there are inherent problems in a direct-to-consumer development, the logistics of shipping and returns being the primary obstacle to workable systems. To achieve efficient costs of transportation, ready-to-assemble (RTA) products have been developed. RTA methods as developed by Home Reserve have been chronicled in industry related media journals, such as Furniture Today.

Primarily a logistics idea, the Home Reserve model is based on optimization and efficiency studies of the movement of materials via various country-wide transportation systems. The model was presented at the 2003 McCloskey business plan competition, at the Gigot Center for Entrepreneurial Studies on the University of Notre Dame campus. A booklet was published for this competition based on a fictitious communication between Professor Matthew Albert of the Institute for Management Development in Lausanne, Switzerland, and the protagonist for the idea of Home Reserve, an American businessman.

The industry tried to port existing models into the internet age using conventional product lines and conventional transportation methods. Freight costs as a percentage of revenues became much higher than anticipated, and when product returns were factored into the cost mix, the financial equations became untenable.

The furniture industry is not unique in its struggle to find a sustainable internet e-commerce model. Even the dominant players in the World Wide Web market space have found profitability difficult. Home Reserve, as a newer company emerging in the internet age itself, has been able to follow different assumptions and cost mechanisms in establishing a methodology of operation.

Product reviews 
Country Almanac wrote: "Home Reserve's low cost furniture collection comes in ready-to-assemble pieces shipped in separate boxes (no heavier than 70 pounds), that fit easily through narrow doors. They even feature internal storage, making them ideal for apartments and other small spaces.

Better Homes and Gardens Special Interest Publications listed Home Reserve as one of the new crop of ready-to-assemble furniture items that delivers instant style on a shoestring budget.

Customer relations
Home Reserve, LLC is not a Better Business Bureau accredited business. At some point, they may have held an A+ ranking.

Company patents
The company has five patents awarded for engineering advancements in the art of ready-to-assemble upholstered furniture:

Patent #: US 6,267,446

Patent #: US 6,568,058

Patent #: US 6,981,747

Patent #: US 7,044,557

Patent #: US 7,523,989

References

External links
 Home Reserve home page

Furniture companies of the United States